Longhaidonglu is a metro station of Zhengzhou Metro Line 2.

Station layout

Exits

References 

Stations of Zhengzhou Metro
Line 2, Zhengzhou Metro
Railway stations in China opened in 2016